Storen or Støren is a surname. Notable people with the name include:

Drew Storen (born 1987), American baseball player
Finn Støren (1893–1962), Norwegian businessperson and civil servant 
Hannah Storen or Hannah Storm (born 1962), American television sports journalist
Johan Nicolai Støren (1871–1956), Norwegian bishop and theologian
Mike Storen (1935–2020), American sports executive
Peter Johan Støren (1859–1925), Norwegian operating manager and politician